Fariborz, also spelled as Fariburz and Faribarz, is a common Persian given name. It is a combination of two root words: "Fari" and "Borz".  "Fari" trasnlates roughly to grand and expanding.  "Borz" translates to one's body or profile. This name is cited in Shahnameh (the book of the kings, Ferdowsi' masterpiece) where Fariborz is son of Kay-Kavoos who is son of Kay-Ghobad.

Notable people with the name include:

Fariborz Arabnia (1964), Iranian actor
Fariborz Esmaeili, Iranian football Midfielder who played for Iran in the 1964 Summer Olympics
Fariborz Haghighat (1951), Canadian academic
Fariborz Lachini (1949), Canadian-Iranian film score composer
Fariborz Kamkari (1971), Kurdish Iranian film director and producer
Fariborz Maseeh, American engineer, entrepreneur and philanthropist (www.massiah.com)
Fariborz Raisdana, Iranian economist
Fariborz Sahba (1948), Iranian-American architect

Persian masculine given names